Princess Maria Czartoryska (formerly Duchess Louis of Württemberg; 15 March 1768, Warsaw – 21 October 1854, Paris), was a Polish noble, writer, musician and philanthropist.

Life
Maria Anna was a daughter of Prince Adam Kazimierz Czartoryski and Countess Isabella von Flemming. She spent her childhood in the Blue Palace in Warsaw and Powązki. In 1782 she moved with her parents to Puławy.

Since 1784 to 1793 Maria was married to Duke Louis of Württemberg, who became the Hetman of the Lithuanian Army in the 1792 war against Russia. Maria divorced him when his betrayal of the Polish–Lithuanian Commonwealth became known. Maria's only son, Duke Adam of Württemberg, remained with his father and was raised in an atmosphere prejudiced against his mother and Poland.

Following her divorce, Maria lived mostly in Warsaw, and since 1798 to 1804 spent winters in Vienna and summers at Puławy. Between 1808-1816 she hosted her literary salon in Warsaw (Blue Saturdays). Her guests included Julian Ursyn Niemcewicz. She attended meetings of the Xs Society (Towarzystwo Iksów). In 1816 she published Malvina, or the Heart's Intuition, considered Poland's first psychological novel.

Charmed with the picturesque village of Pilica she bought it and remodelled its landscape garden. She built a palace and a Catholic church. The park in Pilica was considered among the most beautiful in Europe, and rivalled other parks in Poland: Powązki (established by Maria's mother) and Helena Radziwiłł's Arkadia. Maria hired Franciszek Lessel as her land agent.

Maria Wirtemberska was an active philanthropist. She provided education and published calendars for the peasantry.

Following the November Uprising Maria moved to Sieniawa, then in Galicia. In 1837 she moved to Paris, where she lived with her brother, Adam Jerzy Czartoryski.

Works

Book 
 Malvina, or the Heart's Intuition, 1816 (English translation by Ursula Phillips published by Northern Illinois University Press, 2012 )

Chamber music 
piano pieces (published by Antoni Kocipinski)

Vocal music 
Stefan Potocki (published by Rogoczy)

Gallery

References

Maria
1768 births
1854 deaths
Writers from Warsaw
Polish salon-holders
Polish landscape and garden designers
Polish people of German descent
19th-century Polish writers
19th-century Polish women writers
Polish women composers
19th-century Polish nobility